The Tor River (Bahasa Indonesia: Sungai Tor) is a river in Western New Guinea with a total length of .

See also
List of rivers of Western New Guinea
Tor languages

References

Rivers of Papua (province)